Paul Brown (1908–1991) was an American football coach and owner

Paul Brown may also refer to:

Entertainment
 Paul H. Brown (1934–2016), American jazz bassist
 P. R. Brown or Paul R. Brown, graphic designer, photographer, music video and commercial director
 Paul Brown (costume designer) (1960–2017), British costume designer
 Paul Brown, American realist painter, worked on Museum of Polo and Hall of Fame
 Paul Brown, American actor, producer and screenwriter for First Wave

Politics
 Paul Brown (Georgia politician) (1880–1961), American lawyer and politician
 Paul Brown (Australian politician) (born 1969), member of the Western Australian Legislative Council
 Paul C. Broun Sr. (1916–2005), U.S. politician from Georgia
 Paul Broun (born 1946),  U.S. politician from Georgia and son of Paul C. Broun Sr.

Sports
 Paul Brown (baseball) (born 1941), American Major League Baseball pitcher
 Paul Brown (cricketer) (born 1965), English former cricketer
 Paul Brown (Australian footballer) (born 1969), Geelong player of the 1990s
 Paul Brown (racing driver) (1969–2012), American race-car driver
 Paul Brown (bowls) (born 1978), British lawn bowler
 Paul Brown (English footballer) (born 1984), English football midfielder
 Paul Brown (ice hockey) (born 1984), Canadian ice hockey player
 Paul Brown (Caymanian footballer) (born 1991), Caymanian football defender

Other
 Paul W. Brown (1915–2000), American jurist and associate justice of the Ohio Supreme Court
 Paul Neeley Brown (1926–2012), American jurist and U.S. federal judge
 Paul Brown (American journalist) (born 1952), American radio journalist on Morning Edition
 Paul Brown (presenter) (1950–1997), British journalist television presenter
 Paul A. Brown, American academic, businessman, pathologist and writer
 Paul J. Brown, American business executive
 Paul R. Brown, president of Monmouth University, West Long Branch, New Jersey
 Paul Brown, English journalist, founder of Unofficial Football World Championships in 2003

See also
 Paul Brown Stadium in Cincinnati, Ohio
 Paul Brown Tiger Stadium in Massilon, Ohio
 Paul Browne (disambiguation)